Cariza "Ice" Yamson Seguerra (born 17 September 1983),  professionally known as Aiza Seguerra, is a Filipino actor, singer-songwriter, director and guitarist. Initially coming out as a lesbian in 2007, Seguerra now identifies himself as a transgender man.

On 12 August 2016, Seguerra was appointed by President Rodrigo Duterte as Chairperson of the National Youth Commission.

Career
Seguerra first appeared as a three-year-old contestant of Eat Bulaga!'''s "Little Miss Philippines". He subsequently became part of the show from 1987 to 1997.

As a child star, Seguerra appeared in more than 30 movies and TV shows to date. He often portrayed the role of actor and fellow Eat Bulaga! host Vic Sotto’s daughter in numerous films. He portrayed the role of Aiza Kabisote, daughter of Enteng Kabisote in Okay Ka, Fairy Ko! from 1987 to 1997. He only appeared in six films for Regal Films. At age 14, he competed in Bong Revilla's Invitational Shootfest '98, and has won several awards in the sport.

During his late teens, Seguerra began pursuing a career in music; singing and playing the guitar. His single "Pagdating ng Panahon" became a major hit in 2001 which enabled him to start a music career.

Seguerra won The Singing Bee on July 8, 2008 after Rachel Alejandro gave up her throne as defending champion due to other engagements. He defeated his co-contestant singer Bituin Escalante. Seguerra won ₱1,040,000 for a second time on July 10, raising his total winnings to ₱2,080,000.

Seguerra also performed in Singapore for the Singapore Repertory Theatre presentation of the stage play Avenue Q''.

On January 7, 2013, Seguerra entered the Himig Handog P-Pop Love Songs contest as the interpreter for the song entry called "Anong Nangyari Sa Ating Dalawa", written by Jovinor Tan. He performed the song in the grand finals on February 24 at the SM Mall of Asia Arena. The song eventually finished in first place for Best P-pop Love Song thus rewarding the writer of the song with one million pesos in cash.

In 2015, he returned to GMA Network after three years to star in Princess in the Palace, which became a hit.

Personal life
Seguerra is the only child of Decoroso "Dick" Seguerra (of Calauag, Quezon) and Caridad "Caring" Yamson-Seguerra (of Bicol Region).

He studied in O.B. Montessori Center and later enrolled at the College of Fine Arts and Design of the University of Santo Tomas and acquired a college degree.

On August 18, 2007, Seguerra came out publicly as a lesbian. In August 2014, he came out as a transgender man.

In 2013, Seguerra, along with other local celebrities, came together to join the PETA campaign 'Free Mali', a campaign aimed to release Mali, an Asian elephant currently living at the Manila Zoo and the only captive elephant in the Philippines, due to the poor facilities and keepers to care for him. Seguerra spoke up saying that "Mali has been sentenced to a life of loneliness, misery and neglect. When people all around the world are calling for Mali to be freed, in light of the suffering he has endured at the hands of the Manila Zoo, the proposal to bring in more elephants to the zoo is outrageous. They would have to endure the same cramped, concrete conditions, lack of exercise and improper veterinary care as Mali has for the past 36 years."

On December 8, 2014, Seguerra married model and actress Liza Diño in California.

Filmography

Television

Other TV guestings

Film

Discography

Awards

Theater

References

External links
 

1983 births
Living people
21st-century Filipino male actors
21st-century Filipino male singers
Duterte administration personnel
Filipino male child actors
Filipino male film actors
Filipino male pop singers
Filipino male television actors
Filipino transgender people
Filipino LGBT singers
Male actors from Quezon
People from Manila
People from Quezon City
Singers from Quezon
Filipino television variety show hosts
ABS-CBN personalities
Star Music artists
GMA Network personalities
Tagalog people
Transgender male actors
Transgender male musicians
Transgender singers
University of Santo Tomas alumni